Victory Dias is a New Zealand thoroughbred racehorse. Born in 1988, by Avon's Lord out of My Totara Lass.

Victory Dias was bred by D V Moore, C G Anderson (née Tapper), and E V J Tapper, and owned by Moore, Anderson, and Tapper's estate.

The horse ran 27 races in New Zealand, with seven victories and six further placings. Career highlight was victory in the 1993 Telegraph Handicap, ridden by Craig Beets.

See also
 Thoroughbred racing in New Zealand

References

1988 racehorse births
Racehorses bred in New Zealand
Racehorses trained in New Zealand
Thoroughbred family 12-g